The Beloved Vagabond is a 1906 British novel written by William John Locke. It is the most famous work of Locke. In nineteenth-century France, an architect decides to disguise himself as a tramp.

Adaptations
In 1908 Locke adapted the novel into a play. Several film adaptations have been made, including in 1915, 1923 and 1936.

References

Bibliography
 Neuburg, Victor E., The Popular Press Companion to Popular Literature. Bowling Green State University Popular Press, 1983

External links
 

1906 British novels
British adventure novels
Novels by William John Locke
Novels about architects
British novels adapted into films